Burbidgea is a genus of plants in the family Zingiberaceae.  There are five known species, all endemic to the island of Borneo.

Species accepted:

 Burbidgea longiflora (Ridl.) R.M.Sm. — Sarawak
 Burbidgea nitida Hook.f. — Sarawak
 Burbidgea pauciflora Valeton — Borneo
 Burbidgea schizocheila Hackett — Sabah, Sarawak 
 Burbidgea stenantha Ridl. — Borneo

References

Alpinioideae
Zingiberaceae genera
Endemic flora of Borneo
Taxa named by Joseph Dalton Hooker